St. Mary's Assumption Church may refer to:

 St. Mary's Assumption Church, Sławno
St. Mary's Assumption Church (Cottonport, Louisiana), listed on the National Register of Historic Places in Avoyelles Parish, Louisiana
St. Mary's Assumption Church (New Orleans, Louisiana), listed on the National Register of Historic Places in Orleans Parish, Louisiana
St. Mary's Assumption Catholic Church, listed on the National Register of Historic Places in Iron County, Michigan

See also
St. Mary of the Assumption Church (disambiguation)
St. Mary's Church (disambiguation)